Deadmans Lake is a natural lake in South Dakota, in the United States.

Deadmans Lake received its name because a homicide victim was discovered near its shore.

See also
List of lakes in South Dakota

References

Lakes of South Dakota
Bodies of water of Bennett County, South Dakota